Bob Woodward (March 5, 1909 – February 7, 1972) was an American actor of film and television. Best known for his role in The Range Rider (1951–1953).

Career 
Born in Oklahoma, Woodward co-starred in the western California Mail (1936), Pioneer Justice (1947), Range Renegades (1948), and Junction City (1952). Woodward played the role of the stagecoach driver in the two television series, The Gene Autry Show in 43 episodes (1950–55) and Buffalo Bill, Jr. in 20 episodes (1955–1956). He was cast as a henchman on the series The Range Rider in 24 episodes (1951–53). He also appeared in the syndicated series, Annie Oakley. In the 1950s and 1960s, he guest-starred in The Lone Ranger in nine episodes, Tales of Wells Fargo in seven episodes, Have Gun - Will Travel in five episodes, and The Life and Legend of Wyatt Earp in three episodes.

Filmography 
1931 – Rider of the Plains
1936 – California Mail
1937 – The Fighting Texan
1938 – The Frontiersmen
1939 – The Taming of the West
1941 – Sheriff of Tombstone
1946 – Swing, Cowboy, Swing
1947 – Pioneer Justice
1949 – Gun Law Justice
1948 – Range Renegades
1948 – Courtin' Trouble
1948 – Back Trail
1948 – Partners of the Sunset 
1948 – The Sheriff of Medicine Bow
1948 – The Tioga Kid
1948 – Triggerman
1949 – Law of the West
1950 – The Gene Autry Show – TV series
1951 – The Range Rider – TV series
1952 – Junction City
1953: – Jack Slade
1954 – Annie Oakley – TV series
1955 – Buffalo Bill, Jr. – TV series
1958 – The Lone Ranger and the Lost City of Gold
1963 – Red Runs the River

References 
Television Westerns Episode Guide: All United States Series, 1949–1996

External links 

1909 births
1972 deaths
American male television actors
Male Western (genre) film actors
20th-century American male actors
Male actors from Oklahoma
People from Granada Hills, Los Angeles